The Wilson-Young House is a historic mansion in Dellrose, Tennessee, U.S.. It was built in 1850 for Andrew Madison Wilson. It was designed in the Federal architectural style. It has been listed on the National Register of Historic Places since April 13, 1973.

References

Houses on the National Register of Historic Places in Tennessee
Federal architecture in Tennessee
Houses completed in 1850
Houses in Giles County, Tennessee